The Dr. Joseph Angel Villien House, located at 200 W. Joseph St. in Maurice in Vermilion Parish, Louisiana, is a Queen Anne-style house built in 1895.  It was listed on the National Register of Historic Places in 2001.

The listing included seven contributing buildings: the house, "a large mule barn, a potato shed, a 'helper's house' (perhaps built before the main house was started and where a hired man later lived), a privy, a small building where power (presumably carbide gas) for the main house's lights was generated, and a second large barn."  The six smaller buildings are wooden, mostly board and batten, with metal roofs.

References

Houses on the National Register of Historic Places in Louisiana
Queen Anne architecture in Louisiana
Houses completed in 1895
Vermilion Parish, Louisiana